Guastavino is a surname. Notable people with the surname include:

 Rafael Guastavino (1842–1908), Spanish architect and builder
 Jean-Marie Guastavino (1886-1960), French politician
 Carlos Guastavino (1912-2000), Argentine composer
 Pedro Guastavino (born 1954), Argentine politician
 Diego Guastavino (born 1984), Uruguayan football player

See also
 Guastavino tile, patented by Rafael Guastavino in 1885